Peter Warne may refer to:

 Peter Warne, a character played by Clark Gable in the 1934 film It Happened One Night
 Peter Warne, a character played by Jack Lemmon in the 1956 remake You Can't Run Away from It
 Peter Warne, alternate name of  British songwriter Michael Julien